James H. Ward House is a historic home located at Lafayette, Tippecanoe County, Indiana.  It was built about 1875, and is a two-story, Italianate / Second Empire style brick dwelling, with a -story mansard roofed tower.  It features deep overhanging eaves with corner brackets, asymmetrical massing, and an ornate semi-hexagonal, two-story projecting bay.  Also on the property is a contributing carriage house.

It was listed on the National Register of Historic Places in 1988.

James Ward
Ohio native James Harvey Ward (1829–1912) was a local merchant. He moved to Lafayette as a child in the 1830s and worked as a cashier for a pork producer the following decade, before establishing a dry goods business in town in 1856. In 1859 he created a new company, with his twin brother William (1829–1893), specializing in carpets and furniture. A carriage house on the 1116 Columbia Street lot was the company's wholesale warehouse. Their retail store was at the corner of Third and Main in Lafayette, on the second story of a building in Courthouse Square.

Ward died in 1912, aged 83. His wife, Martha, continued to live in the house for three years, after which it became divided into apartments. The addition linking the home to the carriage house was also removed. Martha died in 1933, aged 75.

Ward and his wife are interred in Spring Vale Cemetery in Lafayette.

References

Houses on the National Register of Historic Places in Indiana
Italianate architecture in Indiana
Second Empire architecture in Indiana
Houses completed in 1875
Buildings and structures in Lafayette, Indiana
National Register of Historic Places in Tippecanoe County, Indiana
Houses in Tippecanoe County, Indiana